Dorothy Jane Schiller (April 20, 1916 – January 1992) was an American competition swimmer who represented the United States at the 1936 Summer Olympics in Berlin.  Schiller advanced to the semifinals of the women's 200-meter breaststroke and recorded a time of 3:18.5.

References

External links
 

1916 births
1992 deaths
American female breaststroke swimmers
Olympic swimmers of the United States
Swimmers from Chicago
Swimmers at the 1936 Summer Olympics
20th-century American women
20th-century American people